Maserati VII is the fifth studio album by the rock band Maserati. It was released on October 2, 2012.

Track listing

References 

2012 albums
Maserati (band) albums
Temporary Residence Limited albums